Charmineh (also Romanized as Charmīneh and Charmīnah) is a village in Gandoman Rural District, Gandoman District, Borujen County, Chaharmahal and Bakhtiari Province, Iran. At the 2006 census, its population was 30, in 9 families. The village is populated by Lurs.

References 

Populated places in Borujen County
Luri settlements in Chaharmahal and Bakhtiari Province